The 2017 Regions Tradition was a senior major golf championship and the 29th Regions Tradition, held from May 18-21 at Greystone Golf & Country Club in Hoover, Alabama. It was the second Regions Tradition played at the course.

World Golf Hall of Fame member Bernhard Langer won his second consecutive Regions Tradition and his eighth senior major championship by five strokes over Scott McCarron and Scott Parel.

Venue

The 2017 event was the second Regions Tradition played at Greystone Golf & Country Club.

Course layout

Field
The field consisted of 79 professional competitors.

Nationalities in the field

Past champions in the field

Round summaries

First round
Thursday, May 18, 2017

Lee Janzen, Miguel Ángel Jiménez, Scott McCarron, and Jeff Sluman all shot 65 (−7) in the first round to lead by one stroke.

Second round
Friday, May 19, 2010

Two-time Tradition champion Fred Funk made eight birdies in the second round to shoot a 65 (−7), and lead Scott Parel by one stroke. Parel shot a six-under-par 66 in the second round to enter the third round at 133 (−11).

Third round
Saturday, May 20, 2010

Bernhard Langer shot the round of the day to finish the third round at 204 (−12). Fred Funk and Scott Parel both shot 70 (−2) to remain in 1st and 2nd place, respectively.

Final round
Sunday, May 21, 2017

Bernhard Langer birdied the first two holes to tie Fred Funk and Scott Parel for the lead. Funk regained the lead after a birdie on the par-5 5th hole and extended his lead to two strokes after birdieing the par-4 sixth. Langer cut the lead to one stroke after birdies on seventh and ninth holes, and would take a three shot lead over Parel when Funk triple bogeyed the par-4 12th hole. Langer then birdied 13, 14, and 17 to win his eighth senior major championship by 5 strokes.

Scorecard

Cumulative tournament scores, relative to par

Notes and references

External links
Results on PGA Tour website
Coverage on the Golf Channel

Senior major golf championships
Regions Tradition